STS-61-E was a NASA Space Shuttle mission planned to launch on 6 March 1986 using Columbia. It was canceled after the Challenger disaster.

Crew

Mission objectives 
Columbia was to carry the ASTRO-1 observatory, which would be used to make astronomical observations including observations of Halley's Comet. ASTRO-1 consisted of three ultraviolet telescopes mounted on two Spacelab pallets, controlled by the Instrument Pointing System (IPS) which was first tested on STS-51-F.

After the Challenger disaster, the flight was remanifested as STS-35 and several crew members were replaced. Both Richards and Leestma were reassigned to STS-28 while McBride left NASA in 1989. Vance D. Brand replaced McBride as the commander while Guy S. Gardner and John M. Lounge replaced Richards and Leestma, respectively.

See also 

 Canceled Space Shuttle missions
 STS-35

References 

Cancelled Space Shuttle missions